is a Japanese publisher, headquartered in Shibuya, Tokyo. Gentosha publishes manga magazine Comic Birz, Web comic magazines GENZO, SPICA, Comic MAGNA, literary magazines Lynx, papyrus, as well as business magazine GOETHE.

Publications 
 GOETHE, business magazine geared towards men.
 Papyrus, literary and cultural magazine.
 Comic Birz, monthly seinen manga magazine published by Gentosha Comics, a subsidiary of the company.
 GENZO, monthly seinen Web comic published by Gentosha Comics on the 28th of each month.
 SPICA, monthly shōjo Web comic published by Gentosha Comics.
 Comic MAGNA, monthly shōnen Web comic published by Gentosha Comics on the 28th of each month; it is free-of-charge.
 Lynx, bi-monthly literary magazine published by Gentosha Comics on the 9th of every odd month.

External links
 Gentosha's website 
 Goethe magazine's website 
 papyrus magazine's website 
 Genzo Comic website

 
Book publishing companies in Tokyo
Magazine publishing companies in Tokyo
Manga distributors
Publishing companies established in 1993
Japanese companies established in 1993
Shibuya
Comic book publishing companies in Tokyo